NGC 5000 is a barred spiral galaxy in the constellation Coma Berenices. It was discovered by William Herschel in 1785. It is also known as LEDA 45658, MCG+05-31-144, UGC 8241, VV 460, III 366, h 1544, and GC 3433.

Herschel discovered it with the help of 18.7-inch f/13 speculum telescope. It is very faint, very small and irregularly round with weak concentration.

References

External links 
 

5000
Barred spiral galaxies
Coma Berenices